Bringing Up Father is a 1928 American silent comedy film directed by Jack Conway and starring Marie Dressler, Polly Moran, and J. Farrell MacDonald. The film was based on the newspaper comic strip Bringing Up Father by George McManus. It was remade in 1946 as a sound film, proving popular enough for a spin-off of four Jiggs and Maggie films to be made.

Cast
 Marie Dressler as Annie Moore  
 Polly Moran as Maggie  
 J. Farrell MacDonald as Jiggs  
 Jules Cowles as Dinty Moore  
 Gertrude Olmstead as Ellen 
 Grant Withers as Dennis  
 Andrés de Segurola as The Count  
 Rose Dione as Mrs. Smith  
 David Mir as Oswald 
 Tenen Holtz as Ginsberg Feitelbaum

Preservation
A print was donated by MGM to George Eastman House, Rochester New York.

References

Bibliography
Drew, Bernard A. Motion Picture Series and Sequels: A Reference Guide. Routledge, 2013.

External links

External links

1928 films
1928 comedy films
American black-and-white films
Silent American comedy films
American silent feature films
Bringing Up Father
1920s English-language films
Films based on American comics
Films based on comic strips
Films directed by Jack Conway
Films with screenplays by Frances Marion
Live-action films based on comics
Metro-Goldwyn-Mayer films
1920s American films